Christine Böckmann (née Hense, born 1955) is a German applied mathematician, numerical analyst, and expert on atmospheric lidar. She is an außerplanmäßiger Professor of mathematics at the University of Potsdam, and one of the Principal Investigators of EARLINET, the European Aerosol Research Lidar Network.

Böckmann studied mathematics at the Dresden University of Technology, earning a diploma in 1980 and completing her doctorate (Dr. rer. nat.) in 1984. Her dissertation, Ein ableitungsfreies Verfahren vom Gauß-Newton-Typ zur Lösung von nichtlinearen Quadratmittelproblemen mit separierten Variablen, was supervised by Hubert Schwetlick. She subsequently completed a habilitation at the University of Potsdam.

References

External links

1955 births
Living people
20th-century German mathematicians
German women mathematicians
Applied mathematicians
Numerical analysts
TU Dresden alumni
Academic staff of the University of Potsdam
21st-century German mathematicians
20th-century German women
21st-century German women